Jalan Kubu Gajah–Lenggong (Perak state route A6) is a major road in Perak, Malaysia.

List of junctions

Tambun